Twelvetrees is an English surname, which may originate in Cornwall or in Sussex. Notable people with this surname include the following:

 Billy Twelvetrees (born 1988), English rugby union footballer
 Harper Twelvetrees (1823–1881), British industrialist
 Helen Twelvetrees (1908–1958), American stage and screen performer
 William Harper Twelvetrees (1848–1919), English-Australian geologist

References

English-language surnames